Grange Park is a suburban part of Greater London in the London Borough of Enfield, United Kingdom. It is served by Grange Park railway station. Grange Park is located between Enfield Town to the north Bush Hill to the east, Southgate and World's End to the west, and Winchmore Hill to the south. It was largely built in the early 20th century on the site of Enfield Old Park.  As well as housing there is a retail and commercial area around The Grangeway, that includes the railway station and a public house, the Gryphon.  There are two schools, Grange Park Primary School and Grange Park Preparatory School, and two churches, St. Peter's Church of England and Grange Park Methodist Church (The Church in the Orchard).  An annual Boxing Day Tug of War takes place.

Etymology 
Named from Old Park Grange (marked thus on the Ordnance Survey map of 1877) which was in Old Park (also 1887) earlier the oulde park 1658, Old Bull Park 1822, from Middle English grange 'outlying farm where crops are stored'.

References 

Places in Enfield, London
Districts of the London Borough of Enfield
Areas of London